The Ape-Man Within is a 1995 science book by L. Sprague de Camp, published in hardcover by Prometheus Books.

Summary
The book undertakes to demonstrate how humankind's self-inflicted problems are rooted in its evolutionary past, with primitive survival traits appropriate to ancestral primates who were organized in small, foraging bands still manifesting in modern societies as competitive, adversarial behavior.

Contents
1. Darwinian Man
2. Our Handy Kin
3. The Noble Savage
4. The Breeds of Man
5. The Phantom Aryans
6. Race and Power
7. Goat Island
8. What Makes Us Tick?
9. "And Hate Alone Is True"
10. Conclusions
Notes
Bibliography

Reception
De Camp's approach to his subject has been criticized for oversimplification and inaccuracy in matters of detail.

Notes

External links
 "The Ape-Man Within by L. Sprague de Camp – Book Review" - a positive book review by Tudor Vieru
 "Darwinism made too simple" - a negative book review by Jeffrey McKee

1995 non-fiction books
Science books
Books by L. Sprague de Camp
Prometheus Books books